SearchTempest is an aggregator of online classified advertisements that allows users to search results from craigslist, eBay, and Amazon.com together.

Created in 2006 by Nathan Stretch, SearchTempest was originally named Craig's Helper and was made to help users search more than one craigslist city at once. Eventually, Craig's Helper's name was changed to SearchTempest and began to search eBay and Amazon as well.

In 2007 the offshoot AutoTempest, originally called Hank´s Helper, was created as a specialized aggregator of online classified advertisements for cars.

In 2010, time saving blog LifeHacker recommended SearchTempest to their readers.

References

Aggregation websites
Marketing companies established in 2006